Aliana Taylor "Ali" Lohan (born December 22, 1993) is an American singer, actress, model and television personality. Lohan is the younger sister of actress and singer Lindsay Lohan.

Early life
Lohan was born in Cold Spring Harbor, New York, on Long Island, to Donata "Dina" (née Sullivan) and Michael Lohan, The family later moved to Merrick. She is the younger sister of actress Lindsay Lohan and Michael Lohan Jr, and the older sister of Dakota "Cody" Lohan.  She has three younger paternal half-siblings. 

By the age of 22, she converted to Buddhism after being raised Catholic. As of 2020, she is a Christian music artist.

Career

In 2005, she appeared in her sister Lindsay Lohan's music video for the song "Confessions of a Broken Heart (Daughter to Father)". Lohan's musical career began when she released a Christmas album, Lohan Holiday, in late 2006 under YMC Records (re-released in 2012 as Christmas with Ali Lohan). A single ("All The Way Around") was released on July 9, 2008 (in connection with the reality television series Living Lohan), which reached #75 on Hot Digital Songs.

As an actress, Lohan has largely appeared in uncredited roles in her sister's films, with her 2008 role of Traci Walker in a film adaptation of the R.L. Stine horror/fantasy novel Mostly Ghostly and her 2022 role of Bianca in the Netflix movie Falling for Christmas being her only credited roles.

Lohan began modeling at age three, working through the Ford Model agency and appearing in print campaigns for magazines such as Teen Vogue and Vogue Bambini.  She appeared on the cover of CosmoGirl with sister Lindsay in November 2006. In 2011, she signed a multi-year modeling contract with NEXT models, later appearing on the cover of Fault magazine. In 2013, she signed with the modeling agency Wilhelmina.

On November 15, 2018, Billboard revealed that Lohan had released another single "Long Way Down" and was working on an EP.

Filmography

Discography

Studio albums

Singles

Music videos

Notes
Notes
 A: "All the Way Around" did not enter the Billboard Hot 100 but peaked at number 11 on the Bubbling Under Hot 100 Singles.

References

External links
 

1993 births
Actresses from New York (state)
American child actresses
Female models from New York (state)
Interscope Records artists
Lohan family
Living people
Singers from New York City
21st-century American actresses
American film actresses
American Buddhists
Converts to Buddhism from Christianity
People from Cold Spring Harbor, New York
People from Merrick, New York
21st-century American singers
21st-century American women singers